Silvo Poljanšek (born December 25, 1951) is a former Yugoslav ice hockey player. He played for the Yugoslavia men's national ice hockey team at the 1972 Winter Olympics in Sapporo and the 1976 Winter Olympics in Innsbruck.

References

1951 births
Living people
Ice hockey players at the 1972 Winter Olympics
Ice hockey players at the 1976 Winter Olympics
Olympic ice hockey players of Yugoslavia
Sportspeople from Jesenice, Jesenice
Slovenian ice hockey left wingers
Yugoslav ice hockey left wingers
HK Acroni Jesenice players